is a private university in Iwakura, Kyoto, Japan. The school's predecessor was founded in 1968, and it was chartered as a university in 1979.

The school is noted for its faculties of manga and anime, and being involved in the teaching and training of future manga artists. The dean of the manga faculty is Keiko Takemiya, and noted American anthropologist and translator Rachel Matt Thorn is also an associate professor at the school's faculty of manga. Graduates of the university have forged successful careers in the manga, anime, and media industries. In 2006, Kyoto Seika University and the city of Kyoto established the Kyoto International Manga Museum. Located in a converted elementary school building in downtown Kyoto, it has the world's largest manga collection.

Faculty
Keiko Takemiya (former president, manga)
Kiyokazu Arai (architecture)
Tsutomu Hayama (architecture)
Rachel Matt Thorn (manga)
Gisaburō Sugii (animation)
Yasumitsu Ikoma (oil painting)
Genzo Kawamura (nihonga)
Haruyuki Uchida (sculpture)

Notable alumni 
 Naoto Ohshima, artist and video game designer
 Chiharu Shiota, installation artist
 Yoji Shinkawa, artist and video game designer
 Falcoon, artist
 Stefana McClure, visual artist
 Albert Yonathan Setyawan, contemporary ceramic artist
 Est Em, manga artist
 Hiro Fujiwara, manga artist
 Muneyuki Kaneshiro, manga artist
 Jun Nishida, ceramicist

References

External links
 Official website
 Official website 
 International Manga Research Center

Educational institutions established in 1968
Private universities and colleges in Japan
Universities and colleges in Kyoto Prefecture
Kansai Collegiate American Football League